The Mekong Ganga Cooperation (MGC) Asian Traditional Textiles Museum (Khmer: សារៈមន្ទីរ​វាយនភណ្ឌប្រពៃណីអាស៊ី) is a museum located in Siem Reap, Cambodia. The aims of the museum are to facilitate the communication of the people living along the Mekong and Ganga rivers to show the civilization, culture and trade relations of the member countries such as Cambodia, India, Laos, Myanmar, Thailand and Vietnam.

References

External links
MGC Asian Traditional Textiles Museum

Museums in Cambodia
Museums in Siem Reap